Hope House is a historic home located near Easton, Talbot County, Maryland. It was listed on the National Register of Historic Places in 1979.

About 
It is a seven-part brick mansion in which the central block is the original, Federal portion, built about 1800. The hyphens, wings, and additions were built during the first decade of the 20th century to replace earlier hyphens and wings. It was home to members of the Tilghman and Lloyd families. Later it was occupied by the Starr family and Ruth Starr Rose in 1906, and remodeled a year later in 1907.

References

External links
, including photo in 1976, at Maryland Historical Trust
Hope House, Bruffs Island Road Vicinity, Saint Michaels vicinity, Talbot, MD at the Historic American Buildings Survey

Easton, Maryland
Houses on the National Register of Historic Places in Maryland
Houses in Talbot County, Maryland
Houses completed in 1740
Historic American Buildings Survey in Maryland
National Register of Historic Places in Talbot County, Maryland
1740 establishments in Maryland
Lloyd family of Maryland
Tilghman family